Turkayamjal is a Municipality in Abdullapurmet mandal, Rangareddy district in Telangana, India. Tata Institute of Social Sciences, Hyderabad is located in Turkayamjal.

References

Villages in Ranga Reddy district